Minolia caifassii is a species of sea snail, a marine gastropod mollusk in the family Solariellidae.

Description
The height of the shell attains 5 mm, its diameter 5 mm. The umbilicated, very fragile shell has a conoidal shape. The 5½ whorls are angular and flat above. The first 3 whorls are smooth, the remainder minutely cingulate, granose, and obliquely striate. They are ornamented with chestnut-brown radiating spots and whitish. The body whorl is angular at its base, convex below, and ornamented with 7 minutely grained concentric lirae. The ample umbilicus is scalariform, cingulate, granose, and bounded by a white crenate riblet.

Distribution
This species occurs in the Red Sea and the Gulf of Aden.

References

 Caramagna, G (1888), Bullettino della Societa Malacologica Italiana v. 13 115–148, 1pl.
 Vine, P. (1986). Red Sea Invertebrates. Immel Publishing, London. 224 pp
 Trew, A., 1984. The Melvill-Tomlin Collection. Part 30. Trochacea. Handlists of the Molluscan Collections in the Department of Zoology, National Museum of Wales.

External links

caifassii
Gastropods described in 1888